Richard Morgan “Mo” Cassara (born July 10, 1973) is an American basketball coach and was Hofstra University's men's head coach from 2010–2013. Cassara was named head coach on May 5, 2010, agreeing to a multi-year deal with the university

Cassara is a graduate of Berkshire School, Worcester Academy and St. Lawrence University.  He previously served as the head coach at Worcester Academy and Clark University.  In addition, he was an assistant coach at the University of Dayton and Boston College.

Cassara owns two restaurants in Point Lookout, NY- Mo'Nelisa Italian Restaurant and Point Ale House. He is married to News 12 reporter Elisa DiStefano.

References

1973 births
Living people
American men's basketball players
Boston College Eagles men's basketball coaches
The Citadel Bulldogs basketball coaches
Clark Cougars men's basketball coaches
Dayton Flyers men's basketball coaches
High school basketball coaches in Massachusetts
Hofstra Pride men's basketball coaches
People from Canton, New York
St. Lawrence Saints men's basketball players
Place of birth missing (living people)
Washington and Lee Generals men's basketball coaches